Alexander A. Schomburg, born Alejandro Schomburg y Rosa (May 10, 1905 – April 7, 1998), was a Puerto Rican commercial artist and comic-book artist and painter whose career lasted over 70 years.

Biography
Alex Schomburg was born on May 10, 1905, in Aguadilla, Puerto Rico, as the son of Guillermo Schomburg, a civil engineer and land surveyor of German ancestry and Jewish ancestry, and Francisca Rosa. Alex Schomburg moved to New York City in 1917, where he joined his older brothers and attended public school. In 1923 he began work as a commercial artist with three of his brothers. In 1928, the brothers' partnership ended and Schomburg found work with the National Screen Service, creating lantern slides and working on movie trailers there through 1944.

During the 1930s, in addition to working for the NSS, Schomburg freelanced Better Publications, producing interior line art for Thrilling Wonder Stories and others of the company's pulp magazines. His skill at drawing anything mechanical soon had him illustrating aviation covers for Flying Aces and electronic equipment for the Hugo Gernsback pulp Radio Craft. Schomburg's first science fiction-themed cover was for the September 1939 issue of Startling Stories. As the artist recalled in 1939, "One day the publisher asked me to do an illustration for Thrilling Wonder Stories. I had always been interested in science fiction and they liked the way I handled the art work. I enjoy reading the story as much as doing the illustrations. In my opinion an illustration is very important. For instance, give the same story to two different persons ... then ask them to picture a certain scene. You can bet they'll be entirely different."

The following decade, Schomburg freelanced primarily for Timely Comics, the 1940s forerunner of Marvel, displaying his talent for action tableaux in covers featuring Captain America, the Sub-Mariner, the Human Torch, and other superheroes. His first recorded comic-book work is two covers released the same month, for Daring Mystery Comics #1 and Marvel Mystery Comics #3 (both cover-dated Jan. 1940). Schomburg would draw most of the companies covers, as well as a smattering of single-page interior illustrations, through Marvel Mystery Comics #76 (Sept. 1946). He also provided covers for Pines Publications, for titles including Exciting Comics and America's Best Comics, featuring such superheroes as the Black Terror and the Fighting Yank, as well as for Harvey Comics, including the licensed radio-series crimefighter star of Green Hornet Comics. On some Pines comics from 1947 to 1949, he signed covers as "Xela."

In the early 1950s, Schomburg left comics and spent the remainder of his career on covers and illustrations for science fiction magazines, astrology publications, and books, including the Winston juvenile series.

In 1977, Schomburg and a few of his fellow Golden Age comic book artists collaborated on the Invaders Annual #1, written by Roy Thomas. Schomburg penciled and inked a six-page chapter featuring the Golden Age Human Torch.

Late in life, Schomburg resided in Hillsboro, Oregon, and died in Beaverton, Oregon, on April 7, 1998.

Awards

 Nominated for Hugo Award for Best Professional Artist 1962; runner-up
 Doc Smith Second Stage Lensman Award September 30, 1979 Moscon 1
 Frank R. Paul Award 1984
 Inkpot Award 1985
 Kentucky colonel May 6, 1986
 Chesley Award (A.S.F.A. Award for Artistic Achievement) 1986
 Guest of Honor, PulpCon 16, July 9–12, 1987, Dayton, Ohio
 Lifetime Achievement Award, Kansas City Comic Con, Fall 1989
 First Fandom Hall of Fame award 1990
 47th World Science Fiction Convention Noreascon III Special Committee Award (Lifetime Achievement Award), 1989, for contributions to Science Fiction
 The Will Eisner Award Hall of Fame 1999

Critical assessments
Stan Lee wrote:

See also

List of Puerto Ricans

References

Further reading

External links

The Official Estate of Alex Schomburg. Archived from the original on December 16, 2014.

 

 

1905 births
1998 deaths
American speculative fiction artists
American illustrators
American comics artists
Golden Age comics creators
Science fiction artists
People from Aguadilla, Puerto Rico
Will Eisner Award Hall of Fame inductees
Marvel Comics people
Pulp fiction artists